Marko Mugosa may refer to:
 Marko Mugoša (born 1984), Montenegrin footballer
 Marko Mugosa (basketball) (born 1993), Montenegrin basketball player